Mount Peechee is the third highest peak of the Fairholme Range in Banff National Park. Mt. Peechee is located immediately southeast of Mount Girouard in the Bow River valley south of Lake Minnewanka.

The mountain was named in 1884 by George Dawson after Indigenous guide Alexis Pichè, who escorted George Simpson through the front ranges of the Canadian Rockies.


Geology
Like other mountains in Banff National Park, Mount Peechee is composed of sedimentary rock laid down during the Precambrian to Jurassic periods. Formed in shallow seas, this sedimentary rock was pushed east and over the top of younger rock during the Laramide orogeny.

Climate
Based on the Köppen climate classification, Mount Peechee is located in a subarctic climate zone with cold, snowy winters, and mild summers.

See also
Geology of Alberta

References

External links
 Parks Canada web site: Banff National Park
 Mount Peechee weather: Mountain Forecast

Two-thousanders of Alberta
Mountains of Banff National Park